Qalaaltı is a village in the municipality of Məşrif Qala alti in the Shabran Rayon of Azerbaijan.

References

Populated places in Siyazan District